Mono National Forest was established by the U.S. Forest Service in California and Nevada on July 1, 1908 with , almost all in California, from parts of Inyo, Toiyabe, Stanislaus and Sierra National Forests. On July 1, 1945 the entire forest was divided between Inyo and Toiyabe and the name was discontinued.

References

External links
Forest History Society
Listing of the National Forests of the United States and Their Dates (from the Forest History Society website) Text from Davis, Richard C., ed. Encyclopedia of American Forest and Conservation History. New York: Macmillan Publishing Company for the Forest History Society, 1983. Vol. II, pp. 743-788.

Former National Forests of California
Former National Forests of Nevada
Humboldt–Toiyabe National Forest
Inyo National Forest
Protected areas established in 1908
1908 establishments in California
1908 establishments in Nevada
1945 disestablishments in California
1940s disestablishments in Nevada